Supreme Court Reports may refer to:

 Supreme Court Reports (Canada)
 Supreme Court Reports (India)

See also
United States Reports, reports of the Supreme Court of the United States